Nikolai Demyanovich Psurtsev (February 4, 1900, Kiev – February 9, 1980, Moscow) was a Soviet statesman and military leader, Colonel General of the Communication Troops, Minister of Communications of the Soviet Union.

Biography

Born in Kiev into a Russian peasant family.

From September 1915, he was an apprentice of a telegraph operator, then a telegraph operator at the Ponyri Station of the Kursk Railway, Kursk Station.
February – December 1918 – Red Army soldier of Kozhevnikov's detachment, Ukrainian Front.
December 1918 – July 1920 – Telegraph operator of the Headquarters of the 9th Army, Commissar of the Telegraph of the Army.
July 1920 – January 1921 – Communications Commissioner of the 12th Army.
January – June 1921 – Commissioner of the Communications Department of the Headquarters of Ukraine and Crimea.
June – November 1921 – Commissar of the 6th Communication Regiment.
From November 1921, he was a student of the Higher Military School of Communications of the Red Army.
From July 1924 – Deputy Chief of Communications of the Siberian Military District.
Since November 1927 – Commander and commissar of the 10th Communications Regiment.
1930–1934 – Student of the Military Electrotechnical Academy of Communications.
From February 1935 – Deputy Head of the Combat Training Department of the Communications Directorate of the Workers' and Peasants' Red Army.
From January 1936, he was the Head of the Communications Center of the People's Commissariat of Defense of the Soviet Union.
Since May 1937 – Head of the Department of Long–distance Telephone and Telegraph Communications of the People's Commissariat of Communications of the Soviet Union.
Since March 1938 – Authorized by the People's Commissariat of Communications of the Soviet Union for the Far Eastern Territory.
From April 1939 – Head of the Training Department of the Military Electrotechnical Academy of the Workers' and Peasants' Red Army.
From December 1939 – Chief of Communications of the North–Western Front.
Since April 1940 – Head of the Training Department of the Military Electrotechnical Academy of the Workers' and Peasants' Red Army.
From June 1940 – Deputy Head of the Communications Department of the Workers' and Peasants' Red Army.
From July 1941 – Head of the Communications Department of the Western Front.
From February 1944 – First Deputy Head of the Main Directorate of Communications of the Workers' and Peasants' Red Army.
From April 1946 – Chief of Communications of the General Staff of the Armed Forces of the Soviet Union.
November 1947 – March 1948 – First Deputy Minister of Communications of the Soviet Union.
March 1948 – September 1975 – Minister of Communications of the Soviet Union.
Since September 1975, he has been a personal pensioner of union significance.

Deputy of the Supreme Soviet of the Soviet Union, 4–9 convocations (1954–1979). 
Candidate member of the Central Committee of the Communist Party of the Soviet Union in 1961–1976, Colonel General of the Communication Troops (1945).

He died on February 9, 1980, in Moscow. Buried at the Novodevichy Cemetery.

Remembrance
The Novosibirsk Electrotechnical Institute of Communications, the Kursk Telegraph and the Higher School for Training Communications Workers in Berlin (German Democratic Republic) are named after Nikolai Psurtsev.
In 2000, a Russian postage stamp dedicated to Psurtsev was issued.

Awards
Hero of Socialist Labour (February 3, 1975);
5 Orders of Lenin (February 21, 1945; February 3, 1960; July 18, 1966; February 3, 1970; February 3, 1975);
Order of the October Revolution (February 1, 1980);
4 Orders of the Red Banner (March 21, 1940; January 2, 1942; November 3, 1944; June 24, 1948);
Order of Kutuzov, 1st Class (September 8, 1945);
Order of Suvorov, 2nd Class (April 9, 1943);
Order of Kutuzov, 2nd Class (September 28, 1943);
Medals.

Foreign awards
Knight–Commander of the Order of the British Empire (Great Britain, 1944).

References

Sources
Nikolay Demyanovich Psurtsev // Big Philatelic Dictionary / Nikolay Vladyets, Leonid Ilyichev, Joseph Levitas ... [And Others]; Under the General Editorship of Nikolai Vladinets and Vadim Yakobs – Moscow: Radio and Communications, 1988 – Page 239 – 40,000 Copies –

External links

Psurtsev Nikolay Demyanovich
Biography of Psurtsev Nikolai Demyanovich

1900 births
1980 deaths
Burials at Novodevichy Cemetery
Heroes of Socialist Labour
Recipients of the Order of Lenin
Recipients of the Order of the Red Banner
Recipients of the Order of Kutuzov, 1st class
Recipients of the Order of Suvorov, 2nd class
Recipients of the Order of Kutuzov, 2nd class
Knights Commander of the Order of the British Empire
Soviet colonel generals
Central Committee of the Communist Party of the Soviet Union candidate members
People of the Russian Civil War
Ninth convocation members of the Supreme Soviet of the Soviet Union
Eighth convocation members of the Supreme Soviet of the Soviet Union
Seventh convocation members of the Supreme Soviet of the Soviet Union
Sixth convocation members of the Supreme Soviet of the Soviet Union
Fourth convocation members of the Supreme Soviet of the Soviet Union
Fifth convocation members of the Supreme Soviet of the Soviet Union